is a school in Ginowan, Okinawa which has another branch in Osaka. It was founded in 1983 by Masayuki Makino who became the first principal of the school.

Notable alumni
 Namie Amuro
 Hitoe Arakaki
 Rina Chinen
 D&D
 Da Pump
 Folder 5
 Gwinko
 Asuka Hinoi
 Eriko Imai
 Meisa Kuroki
 Olivia Lufkin
 Anna Makino
 MAX
 Misono
 Daichi Miura
 Hiroko Shimabukuro
 Speed
 Super Monkey's
 Takako Uehara
 Yu Yamada

External links
Yomiuri Online Interview with Masayuki Makino
School History 

Schools in Japan
Schools in Okinawa Prefecture
Schools of the performing arts
Companies based in Okinawa Prefecture
Schools of the performing arts in Japan